Garman is a surname or first name. Notable people with the name include:

Sports
 Ann Garman, All-American Girls Professional Baseball League player
 Judi Garman (born 1954), American softball coach
 Mike Garman (born 1949), American baseball player
 Ralph Garman (born 1964), actor

Science and technology
 Elspeth Garman, crystallographer
 Samuel Garman, naturalist/zoologist/herpetologist from Pennsylvania
 Jack Garman, key figure during the Apollo 11 lunar landing

Other
 Garman sisters, bohemian English family, associated with the Bloomsbury set, and including:
 Kathleen Garman, Lady Epstein (1901–1971)
 Lorna Garman (1911–2000)
 Mary Garman (1898–1979)
 Douglas Garman, British Communist Party Education Secretary, writer and publisher; brother of the Garman sisters

Mythological
Garman mac Bomma Licce, figure in Irish myth

See also
 German, Iran
 Garmin